The National Television and Radio Council of the Republic of Azerbaijan was established on October 5, 2002 with the Decree of the President of the Republic of Azerbaijan "On Television and Radio Broadcasting". The order defines legal, economic, and organizational basis of the television and radio activities aimed at ensuring the right of everyone to freedom of information, opinion and freedom of expression, open and free discussions. Broadcasting in the Republic of Azerbaijan is carried out by state, municipal, private and public broadcasters, which are the basis of the national TV and radio broadcasting system. All broadcasters in the Republic of Azerbaijan, regardless of their ownership and organizational-legal form, have equal rights and bear the same responsibility before the law.

Broadcasting in the Republic of Azerbaijan is free. The freedom of broadcasting is based on the state's provision of the right of citizens to seek, obtain, prepare, transmit and distribute information legally.

Creativity and editorial activities of the broadcasters are carried out on the basis of professional independence and can only be restricted in cases specified by law.

The interference of state and local self-government bodies, political parties, public associations, trade unions, individuals and legal entities in the creative and editorial activity of the broadcasters is forbidden.

Activities 
The broadcaster's activities include the coverage, objectivity, completeness and truthfulness of the information, freedom of expression of citizens' views and views, ideological and political pluralism, impartiality and impartiality, inadmissibility of interference in personal and family life, protection of national and spiritual values, professional ethics and morality compliance with the standards and the quality of the programs.  Activity of the Council includes ensuring the implementation of television and radio broadcasting policies and to regulate this activity. The main tasks of the Council are:

 to regulate the actions of television and radio broadcasters;
 to secure public interest in broadcasting;
 to monitor compliance with the legislation on television and radio broadcasting.

The Council's activities are regulated by the "Regulations on the National Television and Radio Council". The Council is guided by the Constitution of the Republic of Azerbaijan, the laws of the Republic of Azerbaijan, decrees and orders of the President of the Republic of Azerbaijan, resolutions and orders of the Cabinet of Ministers of the Republic of Azerbaijan and the "Regulations on the National Television and Radio Council". The Council is funded from the state budget.

Members 
The Council consists of 9 members. Three members of the Board are appointed for two years, three for four years, and three for six years. Members have the right to be reappointed. The members of the Council elect the chairman and the vice-chairman. The Council is headed by the Chairman of the Council. The Council determines the number of staff members of the Board, appoints its staff and creates structural units within the cost estimate.

Functions 
Functions of the Council are as following:

 prepares and implements development concept for the tele-radio field; 
 defines the technical and quality standards of TV and radio broadcasting; 
 grants a special license for television and radio broadcasting and holds a competition for this purpose; 
 applies administrative penalties and other liability measures to TV broadcasters.

Structure 
Structure of the Council consists of:

 Chairman of the Council
 Deputy Chairman of the Board
 Board members

Cooperation 
On 24–27 May 2004 the chairman of the Council Nusheravan Maharramov visited Turkey to establish cooperation with "Radio Televizyon Ust Kurulu" (RTUK) of Turkey. The parties signed an agreement on "On cooperation and experience exchange".

Developments 
On 24 February 2015, law passed on Amendments to the Law of the Republic of Azerbaijan "On Television and Radio Broadcasting".

On 15 December 2017, Law of the Republic of Azerbaijan on Amendments to the Law of the Republic of Azerbaijan "On Television and Radio Broadcasting" was passed.

The latest amendment was made on November 2, 2018, by the Law of the Republic of Azerbaijan on Amendments to the Law of the Republic of Azerbaijan "On Television and Radio Broadcasting".

At the meeting held on 19 May 2016, the presidential decree dated May 12, 2016 "On providing one-time financial aid to private broadcasters in the Republic of Azerbaijan" was discussed. 2 million manat were allocated to National Television and Radio Council from the reserve fund.

Within the framework of "National Program for Action to Raise Effectiveness of the Protection of Human Rights and Freedoms in the Republic of Azerbaijan", National Television and Radio Council prepared TV programs that educate and enlighten children and studied the possibility to establish a television for children in 2012-2013.

National Television and Radio Council arranges the exercises for the freedom of speech and thoughts for the mass media under the "National Program for Action to Raise Effectiveness of the Protection of Human Rights and Freedoms in the Republic of Azerbaijan".

See also 
 Television in Azerbaijan
 List of Azerbaijani-language television channels

References 

Radio in Azerbaijan
Television in Azerbaijan